The Naval Air Systems Command (NAVAIR) provides materiel support for aircraft and airborne weapon systems for the United States Navy. It is one of the Echelon II Navy systems commands (SYSCOM), and was established in 1966 as the successor to the Navy's Bureau of Naval Weapons.

NAVAIR is headquartered in Naval Air Station Patuxent River in St. Mary's County, Maryland, with military and civilian personnel stationed at eight locations across the continental United States and one site overseas. The current commander as of September 2021 is Vice Admiral Carl P. Chebi, USN. The vice commander is Leslie Taylor, SES. The deputy commander is Mr. Theodore J. Short Jr., SES. The Command Master Chief is CMDCM Todd A. Anselm, USN.

NAVAIR's mission is to provide full life-cycle support of naval aviation aircraft, weapons and systems operated by Sailors and Marines. This support includes research, design, development and systems engineering, acquisition, test and evaluation, training facilities and equipment, repair and modification, and in-service engineering and logistics support.

NAVAIR is organized into eight "competencies" or communities of practice namely: program management, contracts, research and engineering, test and evaluation, logistics and industrial operations, corporate operations, comptroller and counsel.

The competency alignment of the organization is changing to "mission alignment."

NAVAIR provides support (through people, processes, tools, training, mission facilities, and core technologies) to Naval Aviation Program Executive Officers (PEOs) and their assigned program managers, who are responsible for meeting the cost, schedule, and performance requirements of their assigned programs.

Headquarters Groups 

NAVAIR encompasses six headquarters groups that report directly to the Commander, Naval Air Systems Command:

 Sustainment
 Procurement
 Engineering & Cyber Warfare
 Command Operations
 Comptroller
 Office of General Counsel

Commands 
NAVAIR is organized into three Echelon III commands:

Naval Air Warfare Center Aircraft Division (NAWCAD) 
 Naval Air Warfare Center Training Systems Division (NAWCTSD): NAWCTSD is the naval air center for development of simulation-based training systems. NAWCTSD is located in Orlando, Florida.
 Naval Air Warfare Center Aircraft Division (NAWCAD): NAWCAD is the naval air center for Aircraft Systems Development and Testing.  NAWCAD is located at the Naval Air Engineering Station Lakehurst and the Naval Air Station Patuxent River.
 Naval Test Wing Atlantic (NTWL) comprises four test and evaluation squadrons.

Naval Air Warfare Center Weapons Division (NAWCWD) 
NAWCWD is the center for Weapons Systems and Energetics Development and Testing. NAWCWD is located at the Naval Air Weapons Station China Lake and the Naval Air Station Point Mugu.

Commander, Fleet Readiness Centers (COMFRC) 
Fleet Readiness Centers are support activities that provide shore-based and depot level maintenance and support to the Navy's aviation effort. They are under the direction of the office of Commander, Fleet Readiness Centers (COMFRC).

Below are the following Fleet Readiness Centers:

 Fleet Readiness Center East, Marine Corps Air Station Cherry Point
 Fleet Readiness Center Mid-Atlantic, Naval Air Station Oceana
 Fleet Readiness Center Northwest, Naval Air Station Whidbey Island
 Fleet Readiness Center Southeast, Naval Air Station Jacksonville
 Fleet Readiness Center Southwest, Naval Air Station North Island
 Fleet Readiness Center West, Naval Air Station Lemoore
 Fleet Readiness Center Western Pacific, Naval Air Facility Atsugi, Japan
 FRC Aviation Support Equipment (ASE), Solomons Island, Maryland
 FRC Reserve, Naval Air Station Patuxent River

Program Executive Offices (PEOs)

The Naval Air Systems Command Program Executive Offices (PEOs) are organizations responsible for the prototyping, procurement, and fielding of naval air equipment. Their mission is to develop, acquire, field and sustain affordable and integrated state of the art equipment for the Navy.

The Naval Air Systems Command is organizationally aligned to the Chief of Naval Operations. As part of its mission, NAVAIR provides support, manpower, resources, and facilities to its aligned Program Executive Offices (PEOs). The Program Executive Offices are responsible for the execution of major defense acquisition programs. The PEOs are organizationally aligned to the Assistant Secretary of the Navy for Research, Development and Acquisition (ASN(RDA)). The Naval Aviation PEOs are co-located with the Naval Air Systems Command at the Naval Air Station Patuxent River, MD, and operate under NAVAIR policies and procedures.

There are five Naval Air Systems Program Executive Offices.

 Program Executive Office, Air Anti-Submarine Warfare, Assault & Special Mission (PEO(A))
 Program Executive Office, Aviation Common Systems and Commercial Services (PEO(CS))
 Program Executive Office, Tactical Aircraft Programs (PEO(T))
 Program Executive Office, Unmanned Aviation and Strike Weapons (PEO(U&W))
 Program Executive Office, F-35 Lightning II (PEO(F-35))

Products areas
NAVAIR operations can also be subdivided into five product areas:

 Fixed Wing
 Rotorcraft
 Weapons
 Unmanned
 Aviation Systems

Naval Aviation Enterprise

NAVAIR is part of the Naval Aviation Enterprise triad model currently headed by the Commander, Naval Air Forces (CNAF) and supported by the OPNAV Director, Naval Air Warfare.

See also 
U.S. Armed Forces systems commands
 Army Materiel Command
 Marine Corps Systems Command
 United States Navy systems commands
 Naval Sea Systems Command
 Naval Information Warfare Systems Command
 Naval Facilities Engineering Systems Command
 Naval Supply Systems Command
 Air Force Materiel Command
 Space Systems Command

Footnotes

External links
NAVAIR official website
NAVAIR locations
NAVAIR at Joint Base McGuire-Dix-Lakehurst.  See also Joint Base McGuire-Dix-Lakehurst.

Shore commands of the United States Navy
Air Systems Command
Military in Maryland